Alfredtown (known as Alfred Town  until 1988, and previously known as The Shanty) is a rural community in the central east part of the Riverina.  It is about 5 km north of Ladysmith and 14 km east of Wagga Wagga.

Alfredtown is on the Sturt Highway and consists of The Shanty Hotel (otherwise known as The Shanty Tavern & Bistro) and a petrol station combined with small store.

Notes and references

External links

Towns in the Riverina